L'Inferno is a 1911 Italian silent film, loosely adapted from Inferno, the first canticle of Dante Alighieri's Divine Comedy. L'Inferno took over three years to make, and was the first full-length Italian feature film.

Plot
Dante is barred from entering the hill of salvation by three beasts that block his path (Avarice, Pride, and Lust). Beatrice descends from above and asks the poet Virgil to guide Dante through the Nine Circles of Hell. Virgil leads Dante to a cave where they find the river Acheron, over which Charon ferries the souls of the dead into Hell. They also see the three-headed Cerberus and Geryon, a flying serpent with a man's face. They see the Devil eating human beings whole, harpies eating the corpses of suicides, an evil man forced to carry his own severed head for eternity, people half-buried in flaming lava, etc.

There follows a series of encounters in which the two meet up with a number of formerly famous historical figures whose souls were denied by both Heaven and Hell, and they listen to some of their tales told in flashback.  These characters include Homer, Horace, Ovid, Lucanus, Cleopatra, Dido, the traitor Caiphus, Count Ugolino, Peter of Vigna, Francesca Da Rimini and her lover Paulo, Brutus and Cassius, Mohammed, and Helen of Troy. The film's main attraction is the fantastic set designs depicting the horrors of Hell, with excessive violence and gore, designed to frighten the audience into becoming pious or God-fearing.

Cast
 Salvatore Papa as Dante Alighieri 
 Arturo Pirovano as Virgilio 
 Giuseppe de Liguoro as Il conte Ugolino
 Augusto Milla as Lucifer 
 Attilio Motta
 Emilise Beretta

Production
L'Inferno'''s depictions of Hell closely followed those in the engravings of Gustave Doré for an edition of the Divine Comedy, which were familiar to an international audience, and employed several special effects.

As Dante's Divine Comedy places Muhammad in hell, the film also has a momentary unflattering depiction of Muhammad in its Hell sequence (his chest explodes, exposing his entrails).

Nancy Mitford recorded seeing the film in Italy in 1922, referring to it as Dante. She records that it lasted from 9 until 12:15 including two intermissions. She details many of the deaths and tortures from the film. Her description of the film in her letter home is quoted during the biography Nancy Mitford by Harold Acton.

The scenes from Hell from the film were reused in an American 1936 exploitation film, Hell-O-Vision and the 1944 race film Go Down, Death!. Some American state film censor boards required removal of the hell sequences from L'Inferno used in Go Down, Death!, such as one where a woman's bare breast is momentarily seen.

ReleaseL'Inferno was first screened in Naples in the Teatro Mercadante on March 10, 1911. An international success, it grossed more than $2 million in the United States, where its length gave theater owners an excuse for raising ticket prices.

Home video
For many years, L'Inferno was largely unseen and only available in lower quality, incomplete copies. 
In 2004, a newly restored version of the film, combining  British and American prints from the BFI National Archive and the Library of Congress, was released on UK DVD by the Snapper Music label. It was scored by father and son Edgar and Jerome Froese, of the German electronic band Tangerine Dream. The film has English intertitles and subtitles in German, French, Spanish, and Italian. 
In 2011, L'Inferno's centenary, a brand new and more complete digital restoration by Italy's Cineteca di Bologna was released on their own DVD label. This version has original Italian intertitles, optional English subtitles, and a choice of an electro-acoustic score by Edison Studio or a composition for piano by Marco Dalpane. It also has many extras, including some restored early Italian shorts and a bilingual paperback book.

See also
Depictions of Muhammad
Nudity in filmInauguration of the Pleasure Dome, a 1954 film by Kenneth Anger that utilizes footage from L'Inferno''

References

External links

  
 
 
 
 
 http://www.silentera.com/video/infernoHV.html

1911 drama films
1910s fantasy films
1911 films
1911 horror films
Articles containing video clips
Censored films
Films based on Inferno (Dante)
Films directed by Giuseppe de Liguoro
Films set in hell
The Devil in film
Italian black-and-white films
Italian supernatural horror films
Italian silent feature films
Italian fantasy films
Italian drama films
Religious controversies in film
Silent drama films
Silent horror films